Dariya Dil is a 1988 Hindi-language Indian drama film directed by K. Ravi Shankar, starring Govinda, Kimi Katkar, Roshni and Raj Kiran. The film was released on 8 January 1988 in India.

The film has gained renewed interest as one of its songs and dance sequences, in which Govinda's character Ravi appears dressed as Superman and Kimi Katkar's character Radha wearing a Spider-Man costume, has become a widely seen video on YouTube with 10 million views as of Dec 2016.

Cast
Govinda as  Ravi Kumar
Kimi Katkar as  Radha 
Roshni as  Dolly Gogi 
Raj Kiran as  Vijay Kumar
Shoma Anand as  Sapna Kumar  
G. Asrani as Abdul Dawood Suleiman (as Asrani) 
Gulshan Grover as  Gulu Gogi 
Seema Deo as  Laxmi Kumar
Shashi Puri as  Ajay Kumar
Shakti Kapoor as  D.O. Gogi 
Kader Khan as Dhaniram/Maniram (as Kadar Khan) 
Renu Joshi   
Ashok Saxena   
Farita Boyce  
Jugnu  (as Jugune) 
Vinod Tripathi   
Jayshree T. as  Mrs. Maniram 
Yunus Parvez   
Raja Duggal as  Suresh 
Mushtaq Merchant   
Vikas Anand as  Radha's Brother 
Bharat Bhushan as  Beggar

Soundtrack

Footnotes

External links

1988 films
1980s Hindi-language films
1988 drama films
Film and television memes
Films scored by Rajesh Roshan
Films directed by K. Ravi Shankar
Parodies of Superman
Parodies of Spider-Man
Parody superheroes